Euskaltel–Euskadi has been the name of two professional cycling teams:

Euskaltel–Euskadi (1994–2013), a UCI ProTeam, that competed on the UCI ProTour and UCI World Tour, active between 1994 and 2013
Euskaltel–Euskadi, a UCI ProTeam, formed as an amateur team in 2008.